Elections to Hartlepool Borough Council in the ceremonial county of County Durham in England were held on 7 May 1998. One third of the council was up for election and the Labour party stayed in overall control of the council.

After the election, the composition of the council was
Labour 33
Liberal Democrat 8
Conservative 5
Independent 1

Election result

References

1998
1998 English local elections
1990s in County Durham